Salem Pioneer Cemetery (also known as the I.O.O.F. Cemetery or Oddfellows Cemetery) is a cemetery in Salem, Oregon, United States.

Overview

Salem Pioneer Cemetery is one of two historic cemeteries located next to each other at the intersection of South Commercial and Hoyt streets. It is just east of City View Cemetery. The earliest burials center around the Methodist missionary pioneer David Leslie. The Methodist Mission was founded by the Reverend Jason Lee in 1834. This was the first mission to the Native Americans in the Pacific Northwest. After the end of the mission period, settlers poured into the Willamette Valley to take advantage of the land that was being granted due to the passage of the Donation Land Claim Act of 1850, brought to Congress by early pioneer Samuel R. Thurston, Oregon's first delegate.

David Leslie became Jason Lee's principal assistant. He was a leader in the movement to organize the provisional government of Oregon, and a lifelong trustee of the Methodists' Oregon Institute, which was charted as Willamette University by the Territorial legislature in 1854.

In 1985, the City of Salem's Parks Division agreed to be titleholder and steward of the cemetery, mainly due to work done by the Friends of the Pioneer Cemetery. The Friends of the Pioneer Cemetery consists of a group of concerned citizens working together to raise awareness of the rich local history and to raise funds to supplement the limited public monies available to maintain this historic site.

Notable burials

 Captain Charles H. Bennett (1811–1855) plot #106
 Tabitha Moffatt Brown (1780–1858) plot #44
 Asahel Bush (1824–1913) plot #66
 Stephen Fowler Chadwick (1825–1895) 5th Governor of Oregon
 Governor John Pollard Gaines (1795–1857) plot #56
 Alonzo Gesner (1842–1912) plot #549
 Hancock Lee Jackson (1796–1876), 13th Governor of the State of Missouri
 Augustus C. Kinney (1845–1908) plot #603
 Robert Crouch Kinney (1813–1875) plot #588
 David Leslie (1797–1869) plot #135
 John McCourt (1874–1924) plot #200
 Isaac R. Moores (1796–1861) plot #9
 Isaac R. Moores, Jr. (1831–1884) plot #18
 John H. Moores (1821–1880) plot #19
 Lieutenant Frederick Schwatka (1849–1892), plot #113
 George K. Shiel (1825–1893) plot #136
 Samuel R. Thurston (1815–1851) plot #076
 Dr. William Holden Willson (1805–1856)

References

External links

 Salem Pioneer Cemetery (official website)
 

1853 establishments in Oregon Territory
Cemeteries on the National Register of Historic Places in Oregon
Geography of Salem, Oregon
National Register of Historic Places in Salem, Oregon
Protected areas of Marion County, Oregon
Tourist attractions in Salem, Oregon
Odd Fellows cemeteries in the United States